P92 may refer to:

Aircraft 
 Boulton Paul P.92, a prototype British ground attack aircraft
 Convair XP-92, an experimental American interceptor
 Tecnam P92, an Italian light sport aircraft

Other uses 
 , a patrol boat of the Royal Australian Navy
 Papyrus 92, a biblical manuscript
 P92, a state regional road in Latvia